Blush & Blu is a lesbian bar located on East Colfax Avenue in Denver, Colorado. It is the city's last lesbian bar, down from a peak of seven, and one of approximately twenty remaining in the United States.

Blush & Blu is owned by Jody Bouffard who previously owned tHERe Coffee Bar and Lounge from 2005 to 2011 and Her Bar from 2008 to 2011. Bouffard also worked at a bar called The Elle. In 2012, she reacquired tHERe Coffee Bar and Lounge's space, which she reopened as Blush. It gained its current name in 2013 following an expansion, which also included Voodoo Doughnut's first Colorado location.

Bouffard is also an artists, and her work decorates the bar's space.

Controversies
In 2021 a lawsuit was filed against Blush and Blu by three former employees who allege owner Jody Bouffard routinely failed to pay them minimum wage, stole tips during shifts and discriminated against one of the establishment’s only Black employees, among other issues alleged in the suit.

See also
Lesbian Bar Project

References

External links

2012 establishments in Colorado
Bars (establishments)
Buildings and structures in Denver
Drinking establishments in Colorado
Lesbian culture in the United States
Lesbian history
LGBT culture in Colorado
LGBT drinking establishments in the United States
Women in Colorado